Oreosaurus shrevei, known commonly as the luminous lizard or Shreve's lightbulb lizard, is a species of lizard in the family Gymnophthalmidae. The species is endemic to the Northern Range of mountains of the island of Trinidad in the Republic of Trinidad and Tobago. This species was for some time erroneously alleged to be bioluminescent (hence its common name - luminous lizard).

Etymology
The specific name, shrevei, is in honor of American herpetologist Benjamin Shreve.

Habitat

Reproduction
O. shrevei is oviparous.

References

Further reading
 Knight, C. M., W. H. N. Gutzke, and V. C. Quesnel. 2004. Shedding light on the Luminous lizard (Proctoporus shrevei) of Trinidad. Caribbean Journal of Science 40(3): 422-426

Parker HW (1935). "The New Teiid Lizard in Trinidad". Tropical Agriculture, Trinidad 12 (11): 283.

Oreosaurus
Reptiles of Trinidad and Tobago
Endemic fauna of Trinidad and Tobago
Reptiles described in 1935
Taxa named by Hampton Wildman Parker
Taxobox binomials not recognized by IUCN